Rezqabad or Rezaqabad may refer to:
 Rezqabad, Kerman
 Rezqabad, North Khorasan
 Rezqabad, Razavi Khorasan
 Rezqabad Rural District, in North Khorasan Province